
Gmina Jeżów Sudecki is a rural gmina (administrative district) in Jelenia Góra County, Lower Silesian Voivodeship, in south-western Poland.

Neighbouring gminas
Gmina Jeżów Sudecki is bordered by the town of Jelenia Góra and the gminas of Janowice Wielkie, Stara Kamienica, Świerzawa and Wleń.

Villages
The gmina contains the villages of Chrośnica, Czernica, Dziwiszów, Janówek, Jeżów Sudecki, Płoszczyna, Siedlęcin and Wrzeszczyn.

Twin towns – sister cities

Gmina Jeżów Sudecki is twinned with:
 Paseky nad Jizerou, Czech Republic
 Vierkirchen, Germany

References

Jezow Sudecki
Karkonosze County